Nicholas Scruton (born 24 December 1984) is an English former professional rugby league footballer who most recently played as a  for Hull Kingston Rovers in the Super League. He has previously played for the Wakefield Trinity Wildcats, Bradford Bulls, Hull F.C. and the Leeds Rhinos in the Super League. Scruton has also previously represented England.

Background
Scruton was born in Morley, West Yorkshire, England.

Playing career

Hull F.C. (2004)

2004
In 2004 Scruton was loaned to Hull F.C.

He made 18 appearances and scored three tries in total.

Leeds Rhinos (2002-08)

2007
Scruton was part of the Leeds Rhinos' 2007 Super League Grand Final victory, over St. Helens at Old Trafford.

2008
Scruton was also part of the team that won the 2008 World Club Challenge, against the Melbourne Storm at Elland Road. He also played in the 2008 Super League Grand Final victory over St. Helens.

Bradford Bulls (2009-14)

2009
Scruton signed a three-year deal to play for Bradford commencing in 2009.

2011
In 2011, Scruton signed another three-year deal to extend his stay at the Bradford club.

2013
In 2013, he collected many awards after the season with the Bradford side came to an end, where he won the 'Prized Bull Award,' from Head Coach, Francis Cummins.

Wakefield Trinity Wildcats (2014-16)

2014
After Bradford went into liquidation for the second time in two-years in 2014, Scruton was then sold to Wakefield Trinity on a one-year deal.

Hull Kingston Rovers (2017-19)

2017
Scruton joined Hull Kingston Rovers ahead of the 2017 Championship season on a two-year contract. Scruton was one of Hull Kingston Rovers standout players during the 2017 rugby league season, becoming a real 'fans' favourite' in his début year for Hull Kingston Rovers. Scruton was part of the Hull Kingston Rovers side that won promotion back to the Super League, at the first time of asking following relegation the season prior.

2018
It was revealed on 10 October 2018, that Scruton would be staying at Hull Kingston Rovers after signing a new one-year contract.

2019
After injuring himself in pre-season ahead of the start of the 2019 campaign, and not going onto make a single appearance in that season, it was revealed on 20 May 2019, that Scruton had been subsequently released from his contract at Hull Kingston Rovers.

Representative career

England (2004-06)

2004-06
Scruton has previously played for England on several occasions, he also recorded only a single try.

Honours

Career Awards and Accolades

Club (Leeds Rhinos 2002-08)
Super League (2): 2007, 2008
World Club Challenge (1): 2008

Club (Bradford Bulls 2009-14)
2013: Bradford Bulls' 'Prized Bull Award'

References

External links

Hull KR profile
SL profile

1984 births
Living people
Bradford Bulls players
England national rugby league team players
English rugby league players
Hull F.C. players
Hull Kingston Rovers players
Leeds Rhinos players
Rugby league players from Leeds
Rugby league props
Sportspeople from Morley, West Yorkshire
Wakefield Trinity players